Pseudobatos buthi, the spadenose guitarfish, is a ray in the family Rhinobatidae. Described in 2019 based on 82 museum specimens, little is known about this species in the wild. All 82 museum specimens were collected in the 1940s and 1950s and sat hidden at UCLA's fish collection and the Natural History Museum of Los Angeles County until they were described by PhD student, Kelsi Rutledge.

It likely is similar in ecology and behavior to its closest relative, Pseudobatos productus. This species is found in the Gulf of California and is a fairly small ray, with an intermediate body form between that of a shark and a ray. It is benthic and found in shallow water, spending most of its time on the seafloor in sandy, muddy, coastal regions. It is different from other species due to its morphological characters, including a more narrow head and snout, as well as no spots or scales and thorns between orbits and down its snout.

This species garnered a lot of media attention due to the describer, Rutledge, who posted mock birth-announcement style photos with a preserved museum specimen, including Forbes, Spectrum1 News, Smithsonian Magazine.

References

External links 
 Just a freckly girl livin' in a fish world.

buthi
Fish of the Gulf of California
Fish described in 2019